Castle Combe Castle stood to the north of the village of Castle Combe, Wiltshire, England.

The castle was a medieval motte and bailey castle standing on a limestone spur overlooking the Bybrook River. It was probably built by Reginald de Dunstanville, 1st Earl of Cornwall in the 12th century and was unusual in that it had a keep with at least four and possibly five baileys. Earthworks and some stonework remain.

Since 1981 the site has been a scheduled ancient monument and is described in the National Heritage List for England as "Motte and bailey castle 600 meters north of Castle Combe".

Sources

References

Castle Combe
Castles in Wiltshire